Charlie Hewitt (born 6 February 1995) is an English rugby union player, currently playing for Rugby United New York (RUNY) of Major League Rugby (MLR). His preferred position is lock.

Professional career
Hewitt signed for Major League Rugby side Rugby United New York ahead of the 2020 Major League Rugby season, and re-signed ahead of the 2021 Major League Rugby season.

He had previously played for Worcester Warriors and London Scottish, having come from the Worcester academy.

He also represented Houston SaberCats in the 2018 Major League Rugby season and is American qualified.

References

External links
itsrugby.co.uk Profile

1995 births
Living people
English rugby union players
Rugby union locks
American rugby union players
London Scottish F.C. players
Worcester Warriors players
Houston SaberCats players
Rugby New York players